Prasophyllum barnettii, commonly known as the Anglesea leek orchid, is a species of orchid endemic to Victoria. It has a single tubular leaf and between twelve and thirty scented yellowish, reddish or brownish flowers and is only known from a small area in the south of the state.

Description
As with others in the genus, the flowers are inverted so that the labellum is above the column rather than below it. The lateral sepals are a similar size and shape to the dorsal sepal and are sometimes joined to each other near their bases. Flowering occurs from October to December.

Taxonomy and naming
Prasophyllum barnettii was first formally described in 2006 by David Jones and Dean Rouse from a specimen collected near Anglesea and the description was published in Australian Orchid Research. The specific epithet (barnettii) honours the Australian naturalist Paul Barnett (1927-1996).

Distribution and habitat
This leek orchid grows with grasses or shrubs in forest in the Otway Ranges and coastal areas between Anglesea and Princetown.

References

External links 
 

barnettii
Flora of Victoria
Plants described in 2006
Endemic orchids of Australia